The 5th Biathlon World Championships were held in 1963 in Seefeld, Austria. The men's 20 km individual and team were the only competitions.

Men's results

20 km individual 

Each shot missing the target gave a penalty of 2 minutes.

20 km team 

The times of the top 3 athletes from each nation in the individual race were added together.

Medal table

References 

1963
World Championships
International sports competitions hosted by Austria
1963 in Austrian sport
Sport in Tyrol (state)
Biathlon competitions in Austria
 03